Dardanus (Dardanos) was a Stoic philosopher, who lived c. 160 – c. 85 BC.

He was a pupil of Diogenes of Babylon and Antipater of Tarsus. Cicero mentions him as being one of the leaders of the Stoic school at Athens together with Mnesarchus at a time when Antiochus of Ascalon was turning away from scepticism (c. 95 BC). After the death of Panaetius (109 BC), the Stoic school at Athens seems to have fragmented, and Dardanus was probably one of several leading Stoics teaching in this era.

Nothing else is known about his life, and he was presumably dead by the time Cicero was learning philosophy in Athens in 79 BC.

Notes

References
 Algra, K., The Cambridge History of Hellenistic Philosophy. p. 41.  Cambridge University Press, (1999).
 Inwood, B., The Cambridge Companion to the Stoics. p. 27. Cambridge University Press, (2003).

Hellenistic-era philosophers in Athens
Roman-era Stoic philosophers
Roman-era Athenian philosophers
2nd-century BC Athenians
1st-century BC Athenians
1st-century BC philosophers
160s BC births
80s BC deaths